Percy Dale East (1921–1971) was an American journalist who founded and edited Petal, Mississippi's weekly newspaper, The Petal Paper. He is known for his use of satire to criticize white supremacy in Jim Crow-era Mississippi.

Published works

References

Further reading
 
 
 
 
 
 

20th-century American newspaper editors
University of Southern Mississippi alumni
People from Hattiesburg, Mississippi
People from Fairhope, Alabama
1921 births
1971 deaths